David Bruce-Payne (born 1945) is a former cathedral organist, who served at St. Philip's Cathedral, Birmingham, England.

Background

David Malcolm Bruce-Payne was born on 8 August 1945 in Banbury, Oxfordshire. He was a chorister at King's College, Cambridge under Boris Ord and Sir David Willcocks.

He studied the organ at the Royal College of Music and became Assistant Organist at Westminster Abbey and Master of Music at Westminster Abbey Choir School in 1968.

In 1974 he was appointed Organist and Master of the Choristers at Birmingham Cathedral and Head of Music at King Edward's School, Birmingham. He later became a Senior Lecturer and teacher of organ at Birmingham Conservatoire until moving to Weymouth in 2003. He continues to be active as a conductor, organist, composer and teacher.

Career

Organist of:
St. Philip's Cathedral, Birmingham 1974  - 1977
St. George's Church, Edgbaston 1977 - 2003

References

English classical organists
British male organists
Cathedral organists
1945 births
People educated at Bryanston School
People from Banbury
Alumni of the Royal College of Music
Living people
21st-century organists
21st-century British male musicians
Male classical organists